Fascination is a collection of short stories by the Scottish writer  William Boyd. It was published in the United Kingdom in 2004 by Hamish Hamilton and in the United States in 2005 by Knopf Books.

Reviewing the book for The Guardian, M. John Harrison said: "the stories collected here are perfect. They would seem a little too perfect if they weren't also suffused with an understanding of love, desire and emotional incompetence. Behind the comedy and the stacked sleights of hand, vulnerable people can be seen quite clearly, blundering about trying to make contact with one another; personal disaster lurks and real lives are lost."

References

Further reading

External links
 Official website

2004 short story collections
Alfred A. Knopf books
Hamish Hamilton books
Short story collections by William Boyd (writer)